Norman Desmond Bartlett (2 April 1927  – 12 September 2009) was an Australia filmmaker who worked on nature documentary series' such as Survival.

Early life 
Bartlett was born on 2 April 1927 at Canungra, Queensland, Australia. His father had Australia's largest collection of butterflies and introduced Bartlett to natural history.

Works
Flight of the Snow Geese (1972)

Awards 
He was married to fellow filmmaker Jen Bartlett. They were jointly awarded the Royal Geographical Society's Cherry Kearton Medal and Award in 1974.

See also
Survival (TV series)

References

External links 

Des Bartlett's WildFilmHistory bio

1927 births
2009 deaths
Australian film producers